Bridgestone Arena (originally Nashville Arena, and formerly Gaylord Entertainment Center and Sommet Center) is a multi-purpose venue in downtown Nashville, Tennessee, United States. Completed in 1996, it is the home of the Nashville Predators of the National Hockey League.

Ownership
Designed by HOK Sport in conjunction with the Nashville-based architecture/engineering firm Hart Freeland Roberts, INC., it was designed at an angle on the corner of Broadway and 5th Avenue in Nashville in physical homage to the historic Ryman Auditorium, the original home of the Grand Ole Opry.

Bridgestone Arena is owned by the Sports Authority of Nashville and Davidson County and operated by Powers Management Company, a subsidiary of the Nashville Predators National Hockey League franchise, which has been its primary tenant since 1998.

Events

The Predators hosted the NHL Entry Draft here in 2003; it was also the location for the 2016 NHL All-Star Game.

In 1997, it was the venue of the United States Figure Skating Championships, and in 2004 hosted the USA Gymnastics National Championships.  It was the home of the Nashville Kats franchise of the Arena Football League from 1997 until 2001, and hosted the team's revival from 2005 to 2007, when the Kats folded.

The arena has hosted college basketball events, including both men's (2001, 2006, 2010) and women's tournaments of the Southeastern Conference and the Ohio Valley Conference. Nashville will serve as a primary venue for the SEC men's basketball tournament nine times between 2015 and 2025 (2015–2017, 2019–2021, and 2023–2025) after the SEC signed a long-term agreement with the Nashville Sports Council in 2013. It hosted the 2014 NCAA Women's Final Four, the 2018 SEC women's basketball tournament and will host again in 2022 and 2026.

In odd-numbered years, the arena was regularly one of eight sites to host the first and second rounds of the men's NCAA Basketball Tournament for the first ten years of its existence, though it was taken out of the rotation for several years, partly due to the obsolete octagonal mid-1990s-style scoreboard that hung above the arena floor. It was replaced in the summer of 2007 by a new $5 million scoreboard and digital control room.  The NCAA Tournament returned to Nashville in 2012.

Since 2002, the arena has hosted a Professional Bull Riders Built Ford Tough Series  event every year (except in 2005 and 2006) until 2010. The event moved to the Arena in 2002 after having previously occupied the Municipal Auditorium from 1994 to 2001; during the venue's first year hosting this event, the Built Ford Tough Series was known as the Bud Light Cup.

The venue has also hosted numerous concerts and religious gatherings. Beginning in 2006, the Country Music Association Awards have been held in the arena, after the awards show moved from the Grand Ole Opry House with a one-year stop in New York City at Madison Square Garden in 2005.

Due to the 2012–13 NHL lockout, the Predators did not host any games that season until January 19, 2013.  Instead, the arena hosted a Southern Professional Hockey League preseason game between the only other Tennessee pro hockey franchise, the Knoxville Ice Bears, and their cross-border rivals Huntsville Havoc on October 20.

Seating capacity
Bridgestone Arena has a seating capacity of 17,159 for ice hockey, 19,395 for basketball, 10,000 for half-house concerts, 18,500 for end-stage concerts and 20,000 for center-stage concerts, depending on the configuration used. It has also hosted several professional wrestling events and a boxing card since its opening.

The seating configuration is notable for the oddly-shaped south end, which features two large round roof support columns, no mid-level seating, and only one level of suites, bringing the upper-level seats much closer to the floor.

The arena can be converted into the 5,145-seat Music City Theater, used for theater concerts and Broadway and family shows, by placing a stage at the north end of the arena floor and hanging a curtain behind the stage and another to conceal the upper deck. The arena also features  of space in a trade show layout. Morgan Wallen set the attendance record on March 3, 2022, with 19,292 fans in attendance. Kacey Musgraves set the record for the highest attendance for a female headliner with 18,373 fans during the Oh, What a World: Tour.

Arena construction

During construction of the arena there was a major time loss accident October 5, 1995 when a temporary column collapsed. Lead ironworker connector Daniel Lane Foreman suffered a shattered pelvis and was hospitalized for 10 days at Vanderbilt University Hospital.  Ironworker Raymond Vance Foreman received minor injuries and was treated and released.

Notable events
Besides hosting the Nashville Predators, because of its location near Music Row and Nashville's role as the center of country music, Bridgestone Arena has seen many other famous performers and events:

CMA Awards (annually 2006–present, except in 2020 which was held in the nearby Music City Center as it follows the restrictions due to the COVID-19 pandemic)  
CMT Music Awards (annually 2000–2005; 2009–2016; 2018–2019)
2003 NHL Entry Draft June 21, 2003
61st National Hockey League All-Star Game January 31, 2016
2017 Stanley Cup Finals Game 3, 4 and 6; June 2017

Concerts

Awards and nominations
The Bridgestone Arena was nominated for the 2007 Pollstar Concert Industry Venue of the Year Award. This is the fourth time the venue has been nominated. The first was in 1998 as the Nashville Arena, and then in 1999 and 2000 as the Gaylord Entertainment Center. In 2017 it was named loudest arena in sports.

Naming rights

When completed in 1996, the venue was known as Nashville Arena. In 1999, the arena was renamed Gaylord Entertainment Center after a 20-year, $80 million naming rights contract was signed between the Predators and Nashville-based Gaylord Entertainment Company, which at the time was a minority owner of the team.

In February 2005, it was announced that the Predators and Gaylord (which had earlier sold its stake in the team) had reached an agreement terminating any further involvement between them, and that the Gaylord name would remain on the building only until a new purchaser could be found for the naming rights. As a result, many in the Nashville media quickly reverted to calling the facility by its original name. With the beginning of the 2006 season, the Predators began referring to the arena by its original name as well. In doing so, the team replaced the "Gaylord Entertainment Center" wordmark on the center ice circle with the original "Nashville Predators" wordmark from the inaugural season. The "Gaylord Entertainment Center" name, however, was still displayed on the building's exterior signage at that point.

The facility was officially renamed Nashville Arena again, and all Gaylord signage was removed from the building's exterior on March 16, 2007.

On May 18, 2007, Sommet Group, a Franklin-based collection of companies whose services included human resources administration, payroll processing, software development, computer repair, insurance, and risk management bought the naming rights to the arena, and it became known as Sommet Center. Terms of the deal were not disclosed. The company had previously been the corporate title sponsor for the Predators during the 2007 Stanley Cup Playoffs.  The agreement had lasted little more than two years when the Predators sued the Sommet Group on November 25, 2009, for breach of contract, alleging the latter had failed to make numerous payments under the naming rights agreement.  As part of the suit, the Predators stated intentions to seek a new title sponsor for the arena. Sommet Group's headquarters were later raided by the FBI and IRS due to suspicion of fraudulent activities, and the company subsequently filed for bankruptcy and was liquidated. Sommet's founder, Brian Whitfield, was eventually convicted of fraud, including using some of the fraudulent funds to secure the arena naming rights.

Unlike the Gaylord parting-of-ways, Sommet Group's name was stripped from all signage inside and outside the arena as soon as the team was legally allowed to do so. The building briefly resumed using the Nashville Arena moniker until February 23, 2010, when it was announced that the Predators had signed a naming rights deal with Nashville-based Bridgestone Americas, Inc., the North American subsidiary of Japanese tire manufacturer Bridgestone. The arena became known as Bridgestone Arena.

Renovations
In the summer of 2007 a number of renovations were made to what was then called the Sommet Center at a cost of several million dollars. Renovations included changes to concession stands and public areas, as well as major changes to infrastructure. The most obvious change was the August 2007 replacement of the original center-hanging scoreboard (at a cost of $3.6 million) with a new scoreboard made by ANC Sports. The original analog scoreboard had become outdated and was no longer supported by the original manufacturer, making parts difficult to come by.  The new scoreboard is referred to as the "megatron" by arena and Predators staff. In addition, the TV–media control room was renovated at a cost of $2.6 million.

During the summer of 2011, a new NHL-mandated ice and dasherboard system was constructed and installed in the arena. In addition, the south side of the upper concourse was redesigned as a "fan zone". The wall separating the arena and that part of the upper concourse was removed.

In the summer of 2015, the Predators began replacing all of the arena's seating. This project was completed in Summer of 2016.

References

External links

Bridgestone Arena Seating Charts

1996 establishments in Tennessee
Basketball venues in Tennessee
Bridgestone
College basketball venues in the United States
Convention centers in Tennessee
Indoor ice hockey venues in the United States
Nashville Predators
National Hockey League venues
Sports venues completed in 1996
Sports venues in Nashville, Tennessee
Indoor arenas in Tennessee